A Girl from Chicago (Spanish: Una chica de Chicago) is a 1960 Spanish comedy film directed by Manuel Mur Oti and starring Ana Bertha Lepe, Javier Armet and Rafael Durán.

synopsis
A Spanish girl educated in Chicago comes back to her little town and starts a feminist movement. The male hillbillies are confused and scared, so they beg help to a lawyer, the mayor's son.

Cast
 Ana Bertha Lepe 
 Javier Armet 
 Rafael Durán 
 Roberto Rey 
 José María Lado 
 Ángel Ter 
 Porfiria Sanchíz 
 Joaquín Roa 
 Tony Soler
 Manuel Bermúdez 'Boliche' 
 Luana Alcañiz 
 Manuel Requena 
 Lola Alba 
 Pilar Gómez Ferrer 
 Julia Pachelo 
 Ángel Calero
 Josefina Bejarano 
 Ramón Giner 
 Félix Briones 
 Fernando San Clemente 
 Pilar Sanclemente
 Marisa Prado
 José Marco Davó

References

Bibliography 
 Labanyi, Jo & Pavlović, Tatjana. A Companion to Spanish Cinema. John Wiley & Sons, 2012.

External links 
 

1960 comedy films
Spanish comedy films
1960 films
1960s Spanish-language films
Films directed by Manuel Mur Oti
1960s Spanish films